This is a list of issues of NBC's Heroes webcomic, which supplements the psychological thriller superhero television series of the same name. The comics, which NBC refers to as graphic novels, were made available on their official website each Tuesday as part of the Heroes Evolutions experience, starting with Monsters whose release coincided with the first episode of the show. They ceased publication on June 9, 2010 with the release of From the Files of Primatech, Part 8.  Written by the show's writers and drawn by Aspen Comics, they were generally 7-9 pages long, the first page of which is always an advertisement for a vehicle made by Nissan, one of the sponsors for the series. The comics give additional character background and plot information not shown in the television episodes.

WildStorm, a subsidiary of DC Comics released the first 34 chapters in a hardcover volume on November 7, 2007 entitled "Volume One", with a softcover version released later. The collection also includes Tim Sale's artwork as seen on the show. "Volume Two" was released on November 19, 2008, and includes chapters 35-80 bound in a hardcover book.

The comics were available in both PDF and Flash formats; but the NBC page no longer exists.   the PDF versions are mentioned in an orphaned link below. The Flash versions often offered a link to a "hidden surprise", also listed below. A few also had an animated version.

Season 1
The comics listed here were published during Season One of the show, and continued through the summer preceding Season Two.

Season 2
The comics listed here were published during Season Two of the show, and continued through the summer preceding Season Three.

Season 3
The comics listed here were published during Season Three of the show.

Volume 3: Villains
The comics listed here were published during the show's "Volume 3: Villains" arc.

Volume 4: Fugitives
The comics listed here were published during the show's "Volume 4: Fugitives" arc.

Season 4
The comics listed here were published during and after Season Four (Volume Five: Redemption) of the show.

References

External links
 NBC's website for the graphic novels
 as JPG files
 Evolved Humans at Comic Vine

Superhero webcomics
Heroes graphic novels
Heroes
Graphic novels